Allan Cameron (born 1952) is a Scottish author and translator.

Early life 
Allan Cameron was brought up in Nigeria and Bangladesh. He worked at sea. At the age of twenty, he moved to Italy, where he lived for many years. At the age of 31, Cameron went to university. After graduating, he worked in the same department he had studied at. In 1992, he moved to Scotland. Cameron now lives in Glasgow.

Career 

Cameron has published articles in the daily newspaper L’Unità, the Italian current affairs magazine Reset, and the academic journals Teoria Politica and Renaissance Studies. He also contributed the comments on Pope, Hume and Winstanley to Alasdair Gray's Book of Prefaces. His unpublished works include three plays, two in Italian (Quei baffoni di Giorgio Scali and Grembizzot: gli ultimi giorni di uno sconfitto) and one in English (Calvin’s Christ). He has also produced a number of short stories and poetry in both languages.

Cameron has translated seventeen books by a variety of writers, including the post-war Italian philosopher Norberto Bobbio, the president of the European Commission Romano Prodi, and the historian Eric Hobsbawm.

He has published two novels, The Golden Menagerie and The Berlusconi Bonus.

Cameron has published a book on language, In Praise of the Garrulous (2008), a collection of poetry, Presbyopia (2009), and two collections of short stories, Can the Gods Cry? (2011) and On the Heroism of Mortals (2012).

From 2008, Cameron is the editorial director of Vagabond Voices. It is a small, independent publishing house based in Glasgow, committed to introducing new titles from Scottish authors and translating fiction from other languages. Vagabond Voices list aims to reflect literary ambition, promote innovative writers, and provide readers with a range of challenging titles.

Novels

The Golden Menagerie (Luath Press Ltd, 2004)

"Allan Cameron’s The Golden Menagerie is a work almost impossible to classify, although it is just possible to fit this marriage of fantastic invention and reflections on the human predicament and our times, not without a hint of autobiography, into the capacious container called 'the novel'.  In some ways it recalls the conversation pieces of Thomas Love Peacock, although the invention is more fantastic.  Whatever we call it, it is consistently fascinating and readable, the work of a writer of high intelligence who has a stylish way with words". Eric Hobsbawm

"Cameron’s work is neither deliberately obscure, nor is it solemn history or pompous tract á la Aleister Crowley. The Golden Menagerie treads, flies, chatters and barks that fine, aureate line between pretentiousness and patronization which is drawn from the fact that the author knows his stuff and relishes the 'telling' of it as though he were a reader coming across the work for the very first time. This is not easy to pull off, but Cameron has done it. This is a beautiful tale – beautiful, that is, in the old, 'Golden Mean' sense of the word, with its connotations of symmetry, elegance and seasoned confusion – where even an ironically bum line of poetic preamble can connote some poignant aspect of life. …The book is highly rewarding, in the richness, precision and humour of its language, the enviable lucidity of its thought and in that classical humanist quality it insinuates, of simultaneous lightness and profundity, a sleight which can alter perception. A sublimation, perhaps. Or a metamorphosis". Suhayl Saadi, Scottish Review of Books

The Berlusconi Bonus (Luath Press Ltd, 2005), (Vagabond Voices, 2010), was translated into Italian and published by Azimut in Rome.

“… a profound, intelligent novel that asks serious, adult questions about what it means to be alive". – Martin Tierney, The Herald

"The Berlusconi Bonus is an adroit and satisfying satire on the iniquities of present-day life from insane consumerism to political mendacity, globalisation to the War on Terror. It is both very funny and an extremely astute analysis of the evil results of a philosophy which sings the victory song of extreme free-market economics." – Peter Wittaker, The New Internationalist

"This book is never funny… Still, I say buy it. It makes you think." – Dominic Hilton, The New Humanist

"Cameron grapples with Fukuyama’s theories on the end of the totalitarian ideologies and a plausible future scenario in which 'all Muslims were either massacred or expelled from the Federation' and there are 'no tradesmen now, and there are no artists, musicians or writers.'" – La Stampa

Short Stories 

Can the Gods Cry? (Vagabond Voices,2011)

"One of Cameron’s key concerns is the moral apathy, abetted by passivity, which seems to be currently growing in Western society. [One character] captures the state of confusion this often produces when he remarks that what he likes about his age is "that it doesn’t believe in anything very much, and what I hate about it is that it believes in nothing with such a passion." This statement typifies the sardonic high-flown wit which emerges repeatedly and alleviates the collection’s increasing pessimism. … Cameron’s stance is simultaneously distanced, flyting and engaged, his authorial eyes often turns on himself, debunking and wry. His dozen stories are bracingly different, weaving changes in tone and format, and in varieties of language, ranging from street-smart to the quasi-academic. … For the reader there is much work to be done, … Since Cameron’s scrupulousness in everything he writes is undeniable, one wonders why this is so. By persevering, the reader’s reward is often to hear the distant rumble of the gods of rational discourse – crying out, inciting passion and sometimes laughing as they go." – The Scotsman

"Other stories illustrate what is best and worst in the human condition: the selfishness of the wealthy man in 'The Difficulty Snails Encounter in Mating', the brutality of the soldier sent to crush an anti-colonial rebellion in Oman in 'The Sad Passing of Chris Cary'. On the other hand there is the small-scale compassion of an Algerian immigrant worker who evolves a scheme to charge each customer according to their needs.The most extensive of the short stories, 'A Dream of Justice', is set in a future secular Palestinian state where two elderly fighters from the Israeli and Palestinian sides respectively reflect on their past (which is our present). It is a plausible if disturbing picture that Cameron paints – and his injunction to 'dream sensibly' with which the story ends seems to suggest the conflicts and hatreds of now will continue into the future." – The Herald

On the Heroism of Mortals (Vagabond Voices,2012)

"In this collection of short stories, Allan Cameron focuses on the clash of ideas and perspectives, from the domestic to the world-changing. A woman raised in a single-parent family is hectored by her dinner host, a married father, who wants to impress upon her the superiority of his domestic arrangements. Meanwhile, in more upmarket surroundings, a scientist struggles to make sense of his acquaintance’s lack of 'intellectual coherence' in adapting to changes of circumstance." - The Herald

"These stories are of real life, of the tiny details that make up the whole. Endlessly inventive, Cameron has a number of novels that are critically acclaimed, but it is this eclectic collection that shows his true wit, warmth and complexity as a writer." - Socialist Review

Non-fiction titles 

In Praise of the Garrulous (Vagabond Voices, 2008)

This first work of non-fiction by Allan Cameron has an accessible and conversational tone, which perhaps disguises its enormous ambition. Allan Cameron examines the history of language and how it has been affected by technology, primarily writing and printing. This leads to some important questions concerning the "ecology" of language, and how any degradation it suffers might affect "not only our competence in organising ourselves socially and politically, but also our inner selves."

Terry Eagleton defined In Praise of the Garrulous as "a deeply reflective, extraordinarily wide-ranging meditation on the nature of language, infused in its every phase by a passionate humanism".

"It’s a diverting, chewy read, its tone simultaneously chatty, professorial and even vatic. There are some very interesting ideas." – Colin Waters, The Sunday Herald

"Weaving effortlessly from classical literature to the modern day, In Praise of the Garrulous takes language back from the domain of the pedants and reinstates our proudest achievement at the heart of human society" – Lesley Riddoch

"This is a brilliant tour de force, in space and in time, into the origins of language, speech and the word. From the past to the present you are left with strong doubts about the Idea of Progress and our superiority as a modern, indeed at times post-modern, society over the previous generations. Such a journey into the world of the word needs an articulate and eloquent guide: Allan Cameron is both and much more than that." – Ilan Pappé

Presbyopia (Vagabond Voices, 2009)

"Cameron confesses to a weariness with poetry’s old forms and old concerns, particularly the perennial Romantic subjects of love and the exploration of the self. … One admires his determination to reject the pretension and obscurantism that winds its way around too much of the poetry that crosses one’s desk these days." – Colin Waters, The Sunday Herald

"Cameron wants to inspire and galvanise, and it’s a while since poetry was used in that public, declarative way." – Lesley McDowell, Scottish Review of Books

Bibliography

Fiction 

Novels
  The Golden Menagerie (Luath Press Ltd, 2004)
 The Berlusconi Bonus (Luath Press Ltd, 2005), (Azimut, Roma, 2006), (Vagabond Voices, 2010)
Short stories
 Can the Gods Cry? (Vagabond Voices, 2011)
 On the Heroism of Mortals (Vagabond Voices, 2012)

Non-Fiction 
 In Praise of the Garrulous (Vagabond Voices, 2008)
 Presbyopia (Vagabond Voices, 2009)

References

External links
 Vagabond Voices Publishing House
 ilgarrulo, Allan Cameron's website
 Scottish Book Trust page on Allan Cameron
 Note about Cameron's career as a translator in author profile.

1952 births
Living people
Italian–English translators
Scottish writers
British expatriates in Nigeria
British expatriates in Bangladesh